Ictitherium is an extinct genus belonging to the family Hyaenidae and the subfamily Ictitheriinae erected by Trouessart in 1897.
 
It is speculated that I. viverrinum ate plants as well as medium-small mammals and birds. Ictitherium was a very successful and abundant genus, with multiple fossils often being found at a single site. Possibly, this early hyena genus lived in packs and had a social order, much like its modern descendants.

References

Prehistoric hyenas
Miocene carnivorans
Pliocene carnivorans
Zanclean extinctions
Miocene mammals of Africa
Pliocene mammals of Africa
Miocene mammals of Asia
Pliocene mammals of Asia
Miocene mammals of Europe
Prehistoric carnivoran genera